First Lady of Portugal (Portuguese: primeira-dama) is the unofficial title attributed to the wife or Partner of the president of Portugal. To date, there has been no first gentleman of Portugal. The current First Lady is Rita Amaral Cabral, Partner of president Marcelo Rebelo de Sousa.

History
The inaugural first lady of Portugal was Lucrécia de Arriaga (1911–1915), wife of the first president of the First Portuguese Republic, Manuel de Arriaga.

Maria Joana Queiroga de Almeida, Portugal's first lady from 1919 to 1923 and the wife of President António José de Almeida, was one of the country's first first ladies to take on public, ceremonial roles. She took on a very public role in 1920 as the hostess during the official state visit of Leopold III of Belgium, the then-heir to the Belgian throne, in 1920. By contrast, Almeida's successor, Belmira das Neves, first lady from 1923 to 1925, largely avoided the public spotlight, but played a supporting role to her husband, Manuel Teixeira Gomes, behind the scenes.

Role and duties 
The role of the Portuguese president's spouse, be it "First Lady" or "First Gentleman", is not an official office and, as such, they are not given a salary or official duties. The first ladies have played a mere protocol role during official ceremonies and state visits. However, since 1996, under the presidency of Jorge Sampaio, the president's spouse has the right to a workplace and a three-people staff incorporated in the President's Office. In addition, according to the Portuguese State Protocol's order of precedence, the spouse of any high-ranking office holder is given the same rank as theirs, as long as the spouse is also invited to the ceremony.

Since the current president has no spouse and the main candidates in the last presidential election refused to continue with the president's spouse's workplace, the only two first ladies to have used it were Jorge Sampaio and Aníbal Cavaco Silva's wives: Maria José Ritta and Maria Cavaco Silva.

List of first ladies of Portugal

First Portuguese Republic (1910–1926)

Second Portuguese Republic (1926–1974)

Third Portuguese Republic (1974–Present)

In popular culture
In 2005, an exhibit on the history of Portugal's first ladies, called Primeiras-Damas da Republica Portuguesa 1910-2005 (Portuguese First Ladies Exhibition 1910-2005), opened at the IADE Cultural Centre in Lisbon. The exhibition, which encompassed two entire floors of the IADE's cultural centre, included documents, clothing, gowns, jewelry, and letters once owned by Portugal's first ladies.

Items on display included former first lady Maria Helena de Barroso Spinola's black evening gown and 1920s-era clothing, fans and furs worn by Maria das Dores Cabeçada, the first lady in 1926. Pieces from Maria José Ritta, who was the first lady at the time of the 2005 exhibition, included lemon yellow Dior-style suit worn during her employment at TAP Portugal during the 1970s, as well as clothing and dresses worn during state visits to Brazil and other nations.

In 2011, journalist Alberta Marques Fernandes published her book As Primeiras-Damas ("The First Ladies") about the wives of the presidents of the Third Portuguese Republic.

See also
 President of Portugal

References

Portugal